Limenitis weidemeyerii, or Weidemeyer's admiral, is a butterfly from the subfamily Nymphalinae, found in western North America.

Distribution 

Limenitis weidemeyerii is found in western Canada, the northern Great Plains (an outlying population), and the Western United States, from the Rocky Mountains westward to the Sierra Nevada and California. It is named after John William Weidemeyer, a 19th-century entomologist whose specimen from the Rocky Mountains was used to describe the species.

Description 

The Weidemeyer's admiral's wings are black and white on the dorsal side, with rows of white spots across the wings. On the ventral side, the black is replaced by brown with gray markings along the margins of the hindwing. The larvae feed on aspen and cottonwood (Populus), willows (Salix), oceanspray (Holodiscus), and shadbush (Amelanchier). Adults feed on tree sap, carrion, and flower nectar.

Similar species 

 White admiral (two subspecies of Limenitis arthemis)
 Lorquin's admiral (Limenitis lorquini)

References

External links 
 "Weidemeyer's Admiral (Limenitis weidemeyerii) (W.H. Edwards, 1861)". Butterflies of Canada.
 "Caught Between the Pages: Treasures from the Franclemont Collection" Online virtual exhibit featuring a selection of historic entomological writings and images from the Comstock Library of Entomology at Cornell University

Limenitis
Fauna of the Western United States
Fauna of the Rocky Mountains
Fauna of the Sierra Nevada (United States)
Fauna of the Plains-Midwest (United States)
Butterflies of North America
Nymphalidae of South America
Butterflies described in 1861